Zinc finger protein 30 is a protein that in humans is encoded by the ZNF30 gene.

References

Further reading 

Human proteins